In Tibetan cuisine, gyaho is a chafing dish in the Han Chinese style: a hot pot of vermicelli, kombu, mushrooms, meatballs, bamboo sprouts and salt. It has special significance, generally eaten by senior monks during important ceremonies.

See also
 List of Tibetan dishes

References

Tibetan cuisine